The 2014 United States Senate elections were held on November 4, 2014. A total of 36 seats in the 100-member U.S. Senate were contested. Thirty-three Class 2 seats were contested for regular six-year terms to be served from January 3, 2015 to January 3, 2021, and three Class 3 seats were contested in special elections due to Senate vacancies. The elections marked 100 years of direct elections of U.S. senators. Going into the elections, 21 of the contested seats were held by the Democratic Party, while 15 were held by the Republican Party.

The Republicans regained the majority of the Senate in the 114th Congress, which started in January 2015; the Republicans had not controlled the Senate since January 2007. They needed a net gain of at least six seats to obtain a majority and were projected by polls to do so. On election night, they held all of their seats and gained nine Democratic-held seats. Republicans defeated five Democratic incumbents: Mark Begich of Alaska lost to Dan Sullivan, Mark Pryor of Arkansas lost to Tom Cotton, Mark Udall of Colorado lost to Cory Gardner, Mary Landrieu of Louisiana lost to Bill Cassidy, and Kay Hagan of North Carolina lost to Thom Tillis. Republicans also picked up another four open seats in Iowa, Montana, South Dakota, and West Virginia. Democrats did not pick up any Republican-held seats, but they did hold an open seat in Michigan.

This was the second consecutive election held in a president's sixth year where control of the Senate changed hands, the first being in 2006. This was also the first time that the Democrats lost control of the Senate in a sixth-year midterm since 1918. With a total net gain of nine seats, the Republicans made the largest Senate gain by any party since 1980. This is also the first election since 1980 in which more than two incumbent Democratic Senators were defeated by their Republican challengers. Days after the election, the United States Election Project estimated that 36.4% of eligible voters voted, 4% lower than the 2010 elections, and possibly the lowest turnout rate since the 1942 election.

As of 2022, this remains the last time that a Republican has won a U.S. Senate election in Colorado. This is the most recent Senate elections where any Republican flipped an open Democratic-held seat. This is also the most recent election where the party winning control of the Senate won the popular vote. It also remains the last time that the president's party has suffered a net loss of Senate seats in a midterm.

Partisan composition
For a majority, Republicans needed at least 51 seats. Democrats could have retained a majority with 48 seats (assuming the two Independents continued to caucus with them) because the Democratic Vice President Joe Biden would become the tie-breaker. From 1915 to 2013, control of the U.S. Senate flipped in 10 of 50 cycles, or 20% of the time. Republicans had lost ground in the 2012 elections, leading to an internal fight among the Republican leadership over the best strategies and tactics for the 2014 Senate races. By December 2013, eight of the twelve incumbent Republicans running for re-election saw Tea Party challenges. However, Republican incumbents won every primary challenge. Although Democrats saw some opportunities for pickups, the combination of Democratic retirements and numerous Democratic seats up for election in swing states and red states gave Republicans hopes of taking control of the Senate. 7 of the 21 states with Democratic seats up for election in 2014 had voted for Republican Mitt Romney in the 2012 presidential election compared to just 1 state with a Republican senator that voted for Barack Obama. Democrats also faced the lower voter turnout that accompanies mid-term elections.

Poll aggregation website FiveThirtyEight gave the Republican Party a 60% chance of taking control of the Senate as of September 28. Another poll aggregation website, RealClearPolitics, gave the Republican Party a net gain of 7 seats. Due to the closeness of several races, it was initially believed that Senate control might not be decided on election night. Both Louisiana and Georgia were seen as competitive, and both states require a run-off election if no candidate takes a majority of the vote.

Two independent candidates (in Kansas and South Dakota) refused to commit to caucusing with either party. In the final months of the race, polls showed them with viable chances of winning, leading some analysts to speculate on the possibility of an "Independent caucus" that could also include Maine Senator Angus King and possibly Vermont Senator Bernie Sanders. However, no Independent won a Senate race in 2014, and King and Sanders continue to caucus with the Democratic Party following the 2014 election.

By midnight ET, most major networks projected that the Republicans would take control of the Senate. The party held all three competitive Republican-held seats (Kentucky, Kansas, and Georgia), and defeated incumbent Democrats in North Carolina, Colorado, and Arkansas. Combined with the pick-ups of open seats in Iowa, Montana, South Dakota, and West Virginia, the Republicans made a net gain of 7 seats before the end of the night. Republicans defeated three incumbent Democrats, a task the party had not accomplished since the 1980 election. Five of the seven confirmed pickups were in states that voted for Mitt Romney in 2012, but two of the seats that Republicans won represent states that voted for Barack Obama in 2012 (Colorado and Iowa). Of the three races that were not called by the end of election night, Alaska and Virginia were still too close to call, while Louisiana held a December 6 run-off election. Virginia declared Democrat Mark Warner the winner of his race by a narrow margin over Republican Ed Gillespie on November 7, and Alaska declared Dan Sullivan the winner against Democratic incumbent Mark Begich a week later, on November 12. Republican Bill Cassidy defeated Democratic incumbent Mary Landrieu in the Louisiana runoff on December 6.

Election spending
Altogether, at least $3.67 billion was spent by candidates, parties, committees and outside groups in the 2014 election. Spending on the 2014 Senate elections by outside groups (i.e., organizations other than a candidate's campaign, such as super PACs and "dark money" nonprofit groups) more than doubled from 2010. In the 10 competitive races for which data was available, outside groups accounted for 47% of spending, candidates accounted for 41% of spending, and parties accounted for 12% of spending. The Senate race with the most outside spending was in North Carolina, at $80 million, a new record.

The top outside spenders in the 11 most competitive Senate races were the following:

 On the Republican side, the National Republican Senatorial Committee, Crossroads GPS, U.S. Chamber of Commerce, Ending Spending Action Fund, Freedom Partners Action Fund, American Crossroads, and the NRA Political Victory Fund.
 On the Democratic side, the Democratic Senatorial Campaign Committee, Senate Majority PAC, and NextGen Climate Action Committee.

Results summary
The Republican Party made a net gain of nine U.S. Senate seats in the 2014 elections.

Going into the elections, there were 53 Democratic, 45 Republican and 2 independent senators (both of whom caucus with the Democrats). In all, there were 36 elections: 33 senators were up for election this year as class 2 senators, and 3 faced special elections (all from Class 3). Of all these seats, 21 were held by Democrats and 15 were held by Republicans.

{| style="width:100%; text-align:center"
|+ ↓

|- style="color:white"
| style="background:; width:44%" | 44
| style="background:; color:black; width:2%" | 2
| style="background:; width:42%| 54
|}Colored shading indicates party with largest share of that row.''

Source: Clerk of the U.S. House of Representatives

Change in composition

Before the elections

After the elections

Gains and losses

Retirements
Four Democrats and two Republicans retired instead of seeking re-election.

Resignations
One Republican resigned four years into his six year term.

Nomination withdrawn
One Republican was originally to seek election for a full 6-year term in office but withdrew.

Defeats
Five Democrats sought re-election but lost in the general election.

Race summaries

Special elections during the preceding Congress 

In these special elections, the winners were elected during 2014 and seated before January 3, 2015 — except that one was seated on January 3, 2015, the effective date of the predecessor's resignation.

Elections leading to the next Congress 
In these general elections, the winners were elected for the term beginning January 3, 2015; ordered by state.

All of the elections involved the Class 2 seats.

Closest races 

In seven races the margin of victory was under 10%.

Final pre-election predictions

Predicted probability of Republican takeover
Several websites used poll aggregation and psephology to estimate the probability that the Republican Party would gain enough seats to take control of the Senate.

Predictions
Republicans needed to win at least six in order to gain a majority of 51 seats and Democrats needed to win at least seven in order to hold a majority of 50 seats (including the two independents who currently caucus with the Democrats) and the tie-breaking vote of Vice President Joe Biden.

Alabama 

Three-term incumbent Republican Jeff Sessions had been re-elected with 63% of the vote in 2008. Sessions sought re-election. Democrat Victor Sanchez Williams ran against Sessions as a write-in candidate. Sessions won with 97.3 percent of the vote against assorted write-in candidates.

Alaska 

One-term incumbent Democrat Mark Begich had been first elected with 48% of the vote in 2008, defeating six-term Senator Ted Stevens by 3,953 votes (a margin of 1.25%). Begich was 52 years old in 2014 and was seeking re-election to a second term. Stevens, who would have been almost 91 years old at the time of the election, had already filed for a rematch back in 2009, but was killed in a plane crash the following year.

Republican Lieutenant Governor Mead Treadwell, 2010 nominee Joe Miller, State Natural Resources Commissioner Daniel S. Sullivan, and Air Force veteran John Jaramillo ran for the GOP nomination. In the August 19 primary, Sullivan won the Republican nomination with 40% and defeated Begich in the general election.

Arkansas 

Two-term incumbent Democrat Mark Pryor had been re-elected with 80% of the vote without Republican opposition in 2008. Pryor was running for a third term.

Freshman Representative Tom Cotton of Arkansas's 4th congressional district was the Republican nominee. In the general election, Cotton defeated Pryor.

Colorado 

One-term incumbent Democrat Mark Udall had been elected with 53% of the vote in 2008. Udall was running for re-election.

Congressman Cory Gardner of Colorado's 4th congressional district was the Republican nominee; his late entry into the race caused numerous Republicans to withdraw their candidacies. Gaylon Kent was the Libertarian Party nominee. Unity Party of America founder and National Chairman Bill Hammons was the Unity Party nominee.

Delaware 

Democrat Chris Coons won in the 2010 United States Senate special election in Delaware caused by Joe Biden's election as Vice President, winning by a 57% to 41% margin. Coons sought re-election. His Republican opponent was engineer Kevin Wade, whom Coons went on to defeat in the general election.

Georgia 

Two-term incumbent Republican Saxby Chambliss had been re-elected with 57% of the vote in 2008 in a runoff election with former state Representative Jim Martin; Georgia requires run-off elections when no Senate candidate wins over 50% of the vote. Chambliss did not seek a third term.

Political activist Derrick Grayson, Representatives Jack Kingston of Georgia's 1st congressional district, Paul Broun of Georgia's 10th congressional district, and Phil Gingrey of Georgia's 11th congressional district all declared their candidacy for the Republican nomination, as did former Secretary of State Karen Handel. In the May 20 primary, no candidate received a majority of votes, so the top two candidates faced each other in a runoff; Perdue narrowly won against Kingston in the runoff primary election on July 22 with 50.9% of the vote.

Michelle Nunn, CEO of Points of Light and the daughter of former U.S. Senator Sam Nunn, won the Democratic nomination. Other declared Democratic candidates included former State Senator Steen Miles, psychiatrist Branko Radulovacki, and former US Army Ranger Todd Robinson. Amanda Swafford, a former Flowery Branch, Georgia city councilwoman, received the Libertarian Party of Georgia nomination.

Hawaii (special) 

Daniel Inouye, the second longest serving United States Senator in U.S. history, died on December 17, 2012, after respiratory complications. Hawaii law allows the Governor of Hawaii, to appoint an interim Senator "who serves until the next regularly-scheduled general election, chosen from a list of three prospective appointees that the prior incumbent's political party submits". Governor Neil Abercrombie did so, selecting Lieutenant Governor Brian Schatz to fill the Senate seat. Inouye had been re-elected in 2010 with 72% of the vote. Schatz was challenged in the Democratic primary by Congresswoman Colleen Hanabusa of Hawaii's 1st congressional district, who Inouye had hoped would be his successor. Schatz defeated Hanabusa in the primary with 48.5% to 47.8%.

Campbell Cavasso, former State Representative and nominee for the U.S. Senate in 2004 and 2010, was the Republican nominee.

Idaho 

One-term incumbent Republican Jim Risch had been elected with 58% of the vote in 2008. Risch sought a second term.

Boise attorney Nels Mitchell was the Democratic nominee.

Illinois 

Three-term incumbent and Senate Majority Whip Democrat Dick Durbin had been re-elected with 68% of the vote in 2008. Durbin ran for a fourth term.

State Senator Jim Oberweis was the Republican nominee. He defeated primary challenger Doug Truax with 56% of the vote.

Iowa 

Five-term incumbent Democrat Tom Harkin had been re-elected with 63% of the vote in 2008. Harkin announced on January 26, 2013, that he would not seek a sixth term. Congressman Bruce Braley was the Democratic nominee.

State Senator Joni Ernst was the Republican nominee.

Doug Butzier, who was the Libertarian Party's nominee, died in a plane crash on October 13, 2014, but still appeared on the ballot.

Kansas 

Three-term incumbent Republican Pat Roberts had been re-elected with 60% of the vote in 2008. Roberts sought a fourth term. He faced a primary challenge from radiologist Milton Wolf, a conservative Tea Party supporter. Roberts defeated Wolf in the Republican primary by 48% to 41%. Shawnee County District Attorney Chad Taylor won the Democratic nomination. Randall Batson from Wichita was on the general election ballot as a Libertarian. Also, Greg Orman qualified for the ballot as an independent.

On September 3, Taylor announced he was dropping out of the election, leading to speculation that Democrats would support Orman's candidacy. On September 18, the Kansas Supreme Court ruled that Taylor's name had to be removed from the ballot.

Kentucky 

Five-term Republican incumbent and Senate Minority Leader Mitch McConnell had been re-elected with 53% of the vote in 2008. McConnell sought re-election to a sixth term. McConnell defeated businessman Matt Bevin in the Republican primary on May 20.

Kentucky Secretary of State Alison Lundergan Grimes, with support from much of Kentucky's Democratic leadership, won the Democratic primary. Actress Ashley Judd publicly claimed to be considering a run for the Democratic nomination, but ultimately decided against it.

Ed Marksberry pursued an independent bid after dropping out of the Democratic field in September 2013.

Louisiana 

Three-term incumbent Democrat Mary Landrieu had been re-elected with 52% of the vote in 2008. Landrieu ran for a fourth term.

Louisiana uses a unique jungle primary system that eschews primaries in favor of run-off elections between the top two candidates; this run-off can be avoided if the winning candidate receives over 50% of the vote. Democrats Wayne Ables, Vallian Senegal, and William Waymire ran against Landrieu in the election, as did Republicans Bill Cassidy (representative of Louisiana's 6th congressional district), Thomas Clements (small business owner), and retired Air Force Colonel Rob Maness. Electrical Engineer Brannon McMorris ran as a Libertarian.

Because Republican candidate Maness took almost 14% of the votes in the primary, there was a runoff election on December 6, 2014 between Landrieu (42%) and Cassidy (41%). Cassidy won the runoff with 56% of the vote.

Maine 

Three-term incumbent Republican Susan Collins was seeking a fourth term. Shenna Bellows, former Executive Director of the American Civil Liberties Union of Maine, was the Democratic nominee.

Massachusetts 

Five-term incumbent and 2004 Democratic presidential nominee John Kerry had been re-elected with 66% of the vote in 2008. Kerry resigned in early 2013 to become U.S. Secretary of State. Governor Deval Patrick appointed Democrat Mo Cowan to the seat. Democratic Congressman Ed Markey beat Republican Gabriel E. Gomez in the June 25, 2013 special election by a 55% to 45% margin. Markey had served the remainder of Kerry's term before running for re-election to a first full term in 2014. Hopkinton Town Selectman Brian Herr was the Republican nominee.

Michigan 

Six-term incumbent Senator and Chairman of the Armed Services Committee Democrat Carl Levin, the longest-serving senator in Michigan's history, had been re-elected with 63% of the vote in 2008. Levin announced on March 7, 2013 that he would not seek re-election.

Three term Democratic Representative Gary Peters of MI-14 was the Democratic nominee. He defeated Republican former Secretary of State Terri Lynn Land who was unopposed for the Republican nomination.

Minnesota 

One-term incumbent Democrat Al Franken unseated one-term Republican Norm Coleman by 312 votes in a contested three-way race with 42% of the vote in 2008; the third candidate in the race, former Senator Dean Barkley of the Independence Party of Minnesota, won 15% of the vote. Franken sought re-election. State Representative Jim Abeler, St. Louis County Commissioner Chris Dahlberg, co-CEO of Lazard Middle Market Mike McFadden, bison farmer and former hair salon owner Monti Moreno, state Senator Julianne Ortman, and U.S. Navy reservist Phillip Parrish ran for the Republican nomination. McFadden won the Republican primary and is the Republican nominee in the general election.

Hannah Nicollet of the Independence Party of Minnesota also ran.

Mississippi 

Six-term incumbent Republican Thad Cochran, re-elected with 62% of the vote in 2008, ran for re-election. Cochran was the last incumbent Senator to declare his plans, leading to widespread speculation that he might announce his retirement.
Tea Party candidate Chris McDaniel, a conservative Mississippi state senator, ran against Cochran in the Republican primary. Neither McDaniel nor Cochran was able to get 50% of the vote in the first round of the primary, so a runoff election was held June 24. Cochran won the runoff election by 51% to 49%, with the help of Democratic voters eligible to vote in the state's open primaries who chose Cochran as their preferred Republican. McDaniel filed a lawsuit to challenge the results of the run-off, but the challenge was rejected on appeal by the Supreme Court of Mississippi.

Former Congressman Travis Childers was the Democratic nominee.

Montana 

Six-term incumbent Democrat Max Baucus, the longest-serving senator in Montana's history, had been re-elected with 73% of the vote in 2008. Baucus announced on April 23, 2013 that he would retire in 2014, rather than seek re-election to a seventh term. Baucus was appointed as the United States Ambassador to China, leading him to resign from the Senate in February 2014.

Following Baucus's confirmation as ambassador, Governor Steve Bullock appointed the Lieutenant Governor John Walsh to fill the vacant senate seat. Former Lieutenant Governor John Bohlinger was defeated by Walsh in the Democratic primary. Amid controversy over alleged plagiarism in a 2007 research paper, Walsh pulled out of the race. The Montana Democratic Party held a special nominating convention on August 16 to choose a replacement for Walsh. First-term State Representative Amanda Curtis won the nomination, thereby becoming the new Democratic nominee.

Congressman Steve Daines won the Republican nomination over state Representative Champ Edmunds of Missoula and David Leaser of Kalispell.

Nebraska 

One-term incumbent Republican Mike Johanns had been elected with 58% of the vote in 2008. He did not seek a second term. Term limited Republican Governor Dave Heineman considered running for the Republican nomination, but ultimately decided not to do so. Former state Treasurer Shane Osborn, attorney Bart McLeay, banker Sid Dinsdale, and Midland University President Ben Sasse ran for the Republican nomination. In the May 13 primary, Sasse won the Republican nomination.

Trial lawyer David Domina was the Democratic nominee.

New Hampshire 

One-term incumbent Democrat Jeanne Shaheen had been elected with 52% of the vote in 2008. Shaheen ran for re-election. Shaheen defeated Republican nominee Scott Brown, who had represented neighboring Massachusetts in the Senate from 2010 to 2013.

New Jersey 

Incumbent Democrat Frank Lautenberg had been re-elected with 56% of the vote in 2008. After announcing he would not seek re-election, Lautenberg died in June 2013, aged 89, after a long period of ill health.

Newark Mayor Cory Booker, a Democrat, defeated Republican nominee Steve Lonegan by 55%-to-45% in a 2013 special election to replace interim Republican appointee Jeffrey Chiesa. Booker ran for re-election to a full term in 2014. 1978 and 1982 Republican candidate and political operative Jeff Bell was the Republican nominee.

New Mexico 

One-term incumbent Democrat Tom Udall had been elected with 61% of the vote in 2008. Former Doña Ana County Republican Party Chairman David Clements and former New Mexico Republican Party Chairman Allen Weh sought the Republican nomination. Weh won the June 3 primary but lost to Udall in the general election.

North Carolina 

One-term incumbent Democrat Kay Hagan had been elected with 53% of the vote against incumbent Republican Elizabeth Dole in 2008. Hagan was seeking re-election.

State House Speaker Thom Tillis was the Republican nominee. Sean Haugh won the Libertarian nomination.

Oklahoma 

There were 2 elections in Oklahoma, due to the resignation of Tom Coburn.

Oklahoma (regular) 

Three-term incumbent Republican Jim Inhofe had been re-elected with 57% of the vote in 2008. Inhofe sought re-election. Matt Silverstein, an insurance agency owner, ran for the Democratic nomination.

Oklahoma (special) 

Two-term incumbent Republican Tom Coburn had been re-elected with 71% of the vote in 2010, and was not scheduled to be up for election again until 2016. However, Coburn announced his intention to resign at the end of the 113th Congress. A special election to fill his seat took place in November 2014, concurrent with the other Senate elections. Congressman James Lankford was the Republican nominee. State Senator Connie Johnson was the Democratic nominee.

Oregon 

One-term incumbent Democrat Jeff Merkley was narrowly elected with 49% of the vote in 2008. Merkley was running for a second term. State representative Jason Conger, attorney Tim Crawley, IT consultant Mark Callahan, neurosurgeon Dr. Monica Wehby, and former Linn County Republican Chair Jo Rae Perkins all ran for the Republican nomination, with Wehby ultimately winning the nomination in the May 20 primary.

Rhode Island 

Three-term incumbent Democrat Jack Reed had been re-elected with 73% of the vote in 2008. Reed defeated Republican nominee Mark Zaccaria in the 2014 election.

South Carolina 

There were 2 elections in South Carolina, due to the resignation of Jim DeMint.

South Carolina (regular) 

Two-term Republican Lindsey Graham had been re-elected with 58% of the vote in 2008. Graham won the Republican nomination over a field that included state senator Lee Bright. State Senator Brad Hutto won the Democratic nomination.

South Carolina (special) 

Jim DeMint had been elected to a second term in 2010, but resigned from the Senate in January 2013 to become president of The Heritage Foundation, a conservative think-tank. Governor Nikki Haley appointed Congressman Tim Scott as DeMint's replacement. Scott, an African-American, was the Republican nominee to serve out the remainder of DeMint's term. Scott is the first African-American Republican since shortly after Reconstruction to represent a Southern state. Richland County Councilwoman Joyce Dickerson won the Democratic nomination.

South Dakota 

Three-term incumbent Democrat Tim Johnson had been re-elected with 63% of the vote in 2008. Johnson announced on March 26, 2013 that he would not run for re-election. Former Congressional aide Rick Weiland was the Democratic nominee.

Among Republicans, former two-term Governor Mike Rounds announced his candidacy for the GOP nomination on November 29, 2012. Rounds won the Republican nomination over state senator Larry Rhoden, state representative Stace Nelson, and physician Annette Bosworth.

Former Republican U.S. Senator Larry Pressler and Republican State Senator Gordon Howie ran as independents. Pressler did not commit to caucusing with either party, while Howie said he would caucus with the Senate Republicans.

Tennessee 

Two-term incumbent Republican Lamar Alexander had been re-elected with 65% of the vote in 2008. Alexander sought re-election to a third term. On August 7, 2014, Alexander won the Republican nomination over six challengers, including State Representative Joe Carr.

On November 4, 2014, Alexander faced Democratic nominee Gordon Ball, Libertarian Party nominee Joshua James, Constitution Party nominee Joe Wilmothm, and independent Danny Page also ran in the general election.

Texas 

Two-term incumbent Republican John Cornyn, the Senate Minority Whip, had been re-elected with 55% of the vote in 2008. Cornyn sought re-election, and won the 2014 Republican primary with 59% of the vote. David Alameel, a dentist, and Kesha Rogers, a volunteer for The Lyndon LaRouche Policy Institute, faced each other in a run-off election for the Democratic nomination. Alameel won the run-off and was the Democratic nominee.

Virginia 

One-term incumbent Democrat Mark Warner had been elected with 65% of the vote in 2008; he sought re-election. Ed Gillespie, former RNC Chairman and presidential adviser, ran for the Republican nomination. Robert Sarvis, the Libertarian nominee for Governor in 2013, also ran.

West Virginia 

Five-term incumbent Democrat Jay Rockefeller had been re-elected with 64% of the vote in 2008. He announced on January 11, 2013 that he would not seek re-election to a sixth term. Secretary of State Natalie Tennant won the Democratic nomination.

On November 26, 2012, Republican Congresswoman Shelley Moore Capito announced her plans to run for the seat, in hopes of becoming the first Republican Senator elected from West Virginia since 1956. Moore Capito won the Republican nomination and the general election, the first woman to serve as United States Senator from West Virginia.

Wyoming 

Three-term incumbent Republican Mike Enzi had been re-elected with 76% of the vote in 2008. Enzi sought re-election. Liz Cheney, daughter of former Vice President Dick Cheney, briefly entered the race for the Republican nomination, but dropped her bid in January 2014. On August 19, Enzi won the Republican primary election with 82% of the vote, and Democrat Charlie Hardy, a former Catholic priest, won his party's primary election with 48% of the vote.

See also
 2014 United States elections
 2014 United States gubernatorial elections
 2014 United States House of Representatives elections
 113th United States Congress
 114th United States Congress

Notes

References